Adolfo Luxúria Canibal (meaning Adolph Cannibal Lust) is the stage name of Adolfo Morais de Macedo. He was born in 1959 in  Luanda, Angola. Canibal is a Portuguese musician and lawyer, known for his vocals in both the Portuguese rock band Mão Morta and trans-national electronic noise band Mécanosphère.

References

Living people
20th-century Portuguese male singers
20th-century Portuguese lawyers
Year of birth missing (living people)
21st-century Portuguese male singers